Susan Tutt (born 1943) is a British former professional tennis player. She competed as Sue Northen after marriage.

Tutt, a native of Leicester, was active on tour in the 1960s and 1970s. Her first round win over Marion Boundy at the 1969 Wimbledon Championships (6–2, 6–0) lasted only 20 minutes and is considered to be one of the shortest tennis matches on record. The following year she was at the other end of a heavy defeat at Wimbledon when she fell 0–6, 0–6 to Judy Dalton in the second round.

References

External links
 
 

1943 births
Living people
British female tennis players
English female tennis players
Tennis people from Leicestershire